Michelle J. Anderson (born January 30, 1967) is the 10th President of Brooklyn College, and a leading scholar on rape law.

Education 
Anderson graduated from the University of California, Santa Cruz in 1989 with a Bachelor of Arts in Community Studies, earning Honors in the Major, Merrill College Honors, and Senior Thesis Highest Honors. She won the Chancellor's Award for outstanding academic achievement.

While a UC Santa Cruz student, Anderson spent eighteen months "bleaching, dieting, training, tanning, and feigning fundamentalist beliefs to get into the running" for the Miss California beauty pageant, becoming Miss Santa Cruz County.  During the televised pageant, just prior to the announcement of a winner, Anderson unveiled a banner that read "pageants hurt all women."

She attended Yale Law School, where she was notes editor of the Yale Law Journal. Anderson was an intern in the chambers of Judge Ellen Bree Burns on the United States District Court for the District of Connecticut. She worked with Harold Koh, Michael Ratner, and students in the Yale Law School International Human Rights Clinic on litigation on behalf of Haitian refugees. Anderson was also a visiting scholar at the University of Cape Town, South Africa.

Academic career 
After graduating from Yale Law School in 1994, Anderson clerked on the United States Court of Appeals for the Ninth Circuit for Judge William A. Norris. After clerking, she worked as a Fellow and Supervising Attorney at the Appellate Litigation Clinic at Georgetown University Law Center from 1995-97. There, she also earned a Master of Laws in Advocacy.

Anderson joined the faculty of Villanova University School of Law in 1998, where she taught Criminal Law, Criminal Procedure, Feminist Legal Theory, and Children and the Law for eight years, earning top rankings as a professor. She has been a visiting professor at Yale Law School, the University of Pittsburgh School of Law, and Georgetown University Law Center.

She served as Dean at CUNY School of Law from 2006-2016. Under Anderson's leadership, CUNY Law moved from a converted junior high school in Flushing, Queens, to a new, LEED gold-certified building in Long Island City. Under her leadership, CUNY Law achieved excellent national recognition, including top rankings for public interest law, clinical programs, and diversity of the student body and faculty. During her tenure, CUNY Law also launched the Pipeline to Justice Program, the Incubator Program, the Community & Economic Development Clinic, the Center for Urban Environmental Reform, the Center on latino/a Rights and Equality, and the Sorensen Center for International Peace and Justice.

Anderson was a member of the New York City Bar Association's Task Force on New Lawyers in a Changing Profession. She has written on the importance of matching underemployed attorneys with low and moderate-income communities that have great need for legal services they can afford. Along with the New York City Bar Association and some of the city's largest law firms, CUNY Law launched the Court Square Law Project in 2016.

She has been called "one of the legal academy's most perceptive and prolific legal scholars in the area" of sexual assault. Anderson's work traces the history and evolution of rape law and contrasts it with the reform surrounding campus sexual assault. Her scholarship covers the resistance requirement in rape law, rape shield laws, marital rape laws, the corroboration requirement, prompt complaint requirement, and cautionary instructions in rape law, campus sexual assault codes, the place of prostitution and similar prior sexual history in rape cases, and the legal impact of negative social attitudes toward acquaintance rape victims. She has written about sex education's influence on cultural norms of gender in sexuality, the sexual assault of political detainees under South African apartheid, and the traditional constructs of stranger rape and their impact on rape jurisprudence She has also written a new model for how to define rape legally, which focuses on negotiating desires and boundaries. In 2015, Anderson engaged in an "Intelligence Squared" debate on campus sexual assault with Jed Rubenfeld, Jeannie Suk, and Stephen Schulhofer.

Anderson's research has been published in the Yale Law Journal, Boston University Law Review, George Washington Law Review, Hastings Law Journal, Rutgers Law Review, Southern California Law Review, and University of Illinois Law Review.

President of Brooklyn College 
Anderson became the 10th President of Brooklyn College in August 2016.  As her first year as president, Anderson invited Bernie Sanders by writing him a letter and telling him to “come home.”

Honors 
Anderson is a member of the American Law Institute, an Adviser to the ALI's Model Penal Code: Sexual Assault and Related Offenses Project, and a Consultant to its Project on Sexual & Gender-Based Misconduct on Campus. She is a former Policy Chair of the National Alliance to End Sexual Violence.

In 2007, the Feminist Press gave Anderson the Susan Rosenberg Zalk Award. In 2011, Education Update newspaper gave her the Distinguished Leader in Education Award. In 2013, the Center for Women in Government and Civil Society at the University of Albany gave her the Public Service Leadership Award. In 2014, the New York City Bar Association gave her the Diversity & Inclusion Champion Award. In 2016, City & State gave her an Above and Beyond Award for Women of Public and Civic Mind. In 2017, Brooklyn Legal Services gave her a Champion of Justice Award.

References

External links

Michelle J. Anderson at Avvo

University of California, Santa Cruz alumni
Yale Law School alumni
American beauty pageant contestants
American feminists
1967 births
People from Valdosta, Georgia
CUNY School of Law
Deans of law schools in the United States
Women deans (academic)
Georgetown University Law Center alumni
Living people
American legal writers
American academic administrators
American women legal scholars
American legal scholars
People from Brooklyn
Presidents of Brooklyn College